Maria Kovacs is an American psychologist and academic. She is a Distinguished Professor of Psychiatry at the University of Pittsburgh School of Medicine. She is the developer of the Children's Depression Inventory.

Biography
Kovacs earned an undergraduate degree in psychology from Queens College, City University of New York, a master's degree from Teachers College, Columbia University, and a Ph.D. from the University of Pennsylvania School of Medicine. In 1976, with Aaron T. Beck and Arlene Weissman, Kovacs co-authored a study establishing a correlation between suicide and hopelessness. The next year, she published the Children's Depression Inventory, which was largely based on the Beck Depression Inventory that had already been used for adults. In 1979, Beck, Kovacs and Weissman published the Scale for Suicide Ideation (SSI), which measures the frequency and severity of suicidal thoughts.

Kovacs is a Distinguished Professor of Psychiatry at the University of Pittsburgh School of Medicine. She is a fellow of the Association for Psychological Science. She received the 2013 Paul Hoch Award from the American Psychopathological Association in recognition of her research into psychopathology. In 2003, Kovacs was included in the ISI Highly Cited database.

References

External links

21st-century American psychologists
American women psychologists
21st-century American women scientists
21st-century American scientists
University of Pittsburgh faculty
Perelman School of Medicine at the University of Pennsylvania alumni
Teachers College, Columbia University alumni
Queens College, City University of New York alumni
Living people
Year of birth missing (living people)
American women academics